Crossfire is a 1947 American film noir drama film starring Robert Young, Robert Mitchum and Robert Ryan which deals with the theme of anti-Semitism, as did that year's Academy Award for Best Picture winner, Gentleman's Agreement. The film was directed by Edward Dmytryk and the screenplay was written by John Paxton, based on the 1945 novel The Brick Foxhole by screenwriter and director Richard Brooks. The film's supporting cast features Gloria Grahame and Sam Levene. The picture received five Oscar nominations, including Ryan for Best Supporting Actor and Gloria Grahame for Best Supporting Actress. It was the first B movie to receive a best picture nomination.

Plot
In the opening scene, a man is seen beating a Jewish man named Joseph Samuels to death in a hotel room. After the police are called in to investigate his murder, officer Capt. Finlay suspects that the murderer may be among a group of demobilized soldiers who had been with Samuels and his female companion at a hotel bar the night of his death.

Private "Monty" Montgomery, explains his version of the story to investigator Finlay. He claims that he and his friend Floyd Bowers met Samuels at the hotel bar and went up to his apartment to find Samuels talking to Cpl. "Mitch" Mitchell. Soon upon their arrival, Mitch sick from heavy drinking, leaves Samuel's apartment alone, then Monty and Floyd leave a minute or so later. According to Monty's story, that was the last time they saw Samuels alive.

Sergeant Keeley, concerned that Mitch may be the prime suspect, investigates the murder himself, hoping to clear his friend's name. After helping Mitch escape from police capture, Keeley meets him in a movie theater, where Mitch tells his version of the story. Although he was drunk, Mitch remembered Monty arguing with Samuels inside his apartment. After Mitch left, he spent the rest of the night with Ginny Tremaine, a working girl he met in a dancehall. When he wakes up the next morning in her apartment, Ginny was not there, but after hearing a knock at the door, he meets Ginny's husband Mr. Tremaine, who offers to make him coffee. While Mr. Tremaine looks for some cigarettes, Mitch hastily leaves the apartment.

Meanwhile, Monty and Floyd meet in an apartment. Monty tells Floyd to stay out of sight and to keep their stories straight, that they had no argument with Samuels and left his apartment shortly after Mitch. Keeley knocks on their door and talks briefly with Floyd about the killing while Monty hides. After Keeley leaves, Monty – revealed to be the killer – berates Floyd for refusing to stay out of sight, beats and kills him.

Escorted by officer Finlay, Mitch's wife Mary visits Ginny at her apartment, and in an attempt to discover an alibi for her husband, asks Finlay to wait outside, as a cop might make Ginny clam up. If Ginny admits spending the night with Mitch, it will prove he didn't kill Samuels. Ginny claims to have no knowledge of meeting Mitch, then Finlay enters the apartment to question her. Ginny recants, admits to knowing Mitch, but never met him at her apartment. Then Ginny's husband appears from a back room, and tells Finlay that he remembers Mitch, thus providing an alibi.

Back at the police station, Finlay questions Monty a second time, hoping to uncover the motive for Samuels' murder, but sends him on his way. With Keeley in his office, Finlay suspects that antisemitism was the likely motive for Samuels' murder, because no person involved really knew Samuels personally. Both suspect that Monty was responsible for killing both Samuels and Floyd since he's clearly anti-Semitic. With the help of a soldier named Leroy, they set up a trap to catch him. Leroy tells Monty that Floyd wants to meet him and hands him an address where he can find Floyd. Monty shows up to the apartment where he killed Floyd, presumably to check if he's still alive, and encounters Finlay and another cop. Finlay tells Monty he gave himself away as the address on the piece of paper was actually to a different building. Monty tries to escape, but is shot dead by Finlay.

After Monty is killed, Finlay and Keeley say their goodbyes. As Finlay drives away, Keeley looks to Leroy and replies, "Well, how about a cup of coffee, soldier?"

Cast

Production
The film's screenplay, written by John Paxton, was based on director and screenwriter Richard Brooks's 1945 novel The Brick Foxhole. Brooks wrote his novel while he was a sergeant in the U.S. Marine Corps making training films at Quantico, Virginia, and Camp Pendleton, California. In the novel, the victim was a homosexual. As told in the film The Celluloid Closet, and in the documentary included on the DVD edition of the Crossfire film, the Hollywood Hays Code prohibited any mention of homosexuality because it was seen as a sexual perversion. Hence, the book's theme of homophobia was changed to one about racism and anti-Semitism. The book was published while Brooks was serving in the Marine Corps. A fellow Marine, actor Robert Ryan, met Brooks and told him he was determined to play in a version of the book on screen.

Premiere and U.S. military distribution notes
The film premiered at the Rivoli Theatre in New York City on July 22, 1947.

The US Army showed the film only at its US bases. The US Navy would not exhibit the film at all.

Reception

Critical response
When first released, Variety magazine gave the film a positive review, writing, "Crossfire is a frank spotlight on anti-Semitism. Producer Dore Schary, in association with Adrian Scott, has pulled no punches. There is no skirting such relative fol-de-rol as intermarriage or clubs that exclude Jews. Here is a hard-hitting film [based on Richard Brooks' novel, The Brick Foxhole] whose whodunit aspects are fundamentally incidental to the overall thesis of bigotry and race prejudice... Director Edward Dmytryk has drawn gripping portraitures. The flashback technique is effective as it shades and colors the sundry attitudes of the heavy, as seen or recalled by the rest of the cast."

The New York Times film critic, Bosley Crowther, lauded the acting in the drama, and wrote, "Mr. Dmytryk has handled most excellently a superlative cast which plays the drama. Robert Ryan is frighteningly real as the hard, sinewy, loud-mouthed, intolerant and vicious murderer, and Robert Mitchum, Steve Brodie, and George Cooper are variously revealing as his pals. Robert Young gives a fine taut performance as the patiently questioning police lieutenant, whose mind and sensibilities are revolted—and eloquently expressed—by what he finds. Sam Levene is affectingly gentle in his brief bit as the Jewish victim, and Gloria Grahame is believably brazen and pathetic as a girl of the streets."

Critic Dennis Schwartz questioned the noir aspects of the film in 2000, and discussed the cinematography in his review. He wrote, "This is more of a message film than a noir thriller, but has been classified by most cinephiles in the noir category... J. Roy Hunt, the 70-year-old cinematographer, who goes back to the earliest days of Hollywood, shot the film using the style of low-key lighting, providing dark shots of Monty, contrasted with ghost-like shots of Mary Mitchell (Jacqueline White) as she angelically goes to help her troubled husband Arthur."

The review aggregator Rotten Tomatoes reported that 88% of critics gave the film a positive review, based on 24 reviews.

Box office
The film made a profit of $1,270,000.

Awards
Wins
 Cannes Film Festival: Award, Best Social Film (Prix du meilleur film social), 1947
 Edgar Allan Poe Awards: Best Motion Picture, 1948

Nominations, 20th Academy Awards
 Best Picture - Adrian Scott, producer
 Best Director - Edward Dmytryk
 Best Supporting Actor - Robert Ryan
 Best Supporting Actress - Gloria Grahame
 Best Writing, Adapted Screenplay - John Paxton

Other nominations
 British Academy of Film and Television Arts: BAFTA Film Award, Best Film from Any Source, 1949

References

External links

 
 
 
 
 
 Crossfire review at DVD Savant by Glenn Erickson
 

1947 films
1947 crime drama films
American black-and-white films
American crime drama films
Antisemitism in the United States
American detective films
Edgar Award-winning works
1940s English-language films
Film noir
Films about antisemitism
Films about veterans
Films based on American novels
Films directed by Edward Dmytryk
Films scored by Roy Webb
Films set in Washington, D.C.
American police detective films
RKO Pictures films
Palme d'Or winners
1940s American films